Construction Time & Demolition is a studio album by English musician Wreckless Eric. It was released on 30 March 2018 by Southern Domestic Records.

Critical reception
Construction Time & Demolition was met with "universal acclaim" reviews from critics. At Metacritic, which assigns a weighted average rating out of 100 to reviews from mainstream publications, this release received an average score of 82 based on 7 reviews.

Writing on behalf of AllMusic, Stephen Thomas Erlewine noted the album is Eric's most "liveliest records he's ever made", while also pointing out there are "rough edges throughout, including instrumentals that function as atmospheric bridges between the major songs."

Track listing

References

2018 albums
Wreckless Eric albums